The following is a list of Kharkiv Metro stations in Kharkiv, Ukraine. The system opened in 1975 and now has 30 stations.

Kholodnohirsko–Zavodska Line 
 Kholodna Hora
 Pivdennyi Vokzal
 Tsentralnyi Rynok
 Maidan Konstytutsii → Istorychnyi Muzei
 Prospekt Haharina
 Sportyvna → Metrobudivnykiv
 Zavod Imeni Malysheva
Turboatom
 Palats Sportu
 Armiiska
 Imeni O.S. Maselskoho
 Traktornyi Zavod
 Industrialna

Saltivska Line 

 Istorychnyi Muzei → Maidan Konstytutsii
 Universytet → Derzhprom
 Pushkinska
 Kyivska
 Akademika Barabashova
 Akademika Pavlova
 Studentska
 Heroiv Pratsi

Oleksiivska Line 
 Peremoha
 Oleksiivska
 23 Serpnia
 Botanichnyi Sad
 Naukova
 Derzhprom → Universytet
 Arkhitektora Beketova
 Zakhysnykiv Ukrainy
 Metrobudivnykiv → Sportyvna

References